Charles Hutchinson (1636-1695) was an English politician.

He was M.P. for Nottingham during the second and third Parliaments of King William III of England. He was the 5th son of Sir Thomas Hutchinson (M.P.) by his second wife Lady Catherine Stanhope of Selford and his first son by Lady Catherine. His mother was the daughter of Sir John Stanhope, and the half sister of Philip Stanhope, 1st Earl of Chesterfield.

Family

He married Issabella Boteler or Butler, she was the daughter of Sir Francis Boteler or Butler of Hatfield Woodhall. His niece was Catherine Cotton daughter of Charles Cotton. She was married to Sir Kingsmill Lucy 2nd Bt. Their son was Sir Berkeley Lucy 3rd Bt. His mother was Lady Theophila Berkeley daughter of George Berkeley, 1st Earl of Berkeley.

Children
Julius Hutchinson (b. ca.1665 – 1730) Issue his son Thomas Hutchinson (died 1774)
Catherine Hutchinson Issue
Norton Hutchinson  Issue Rev. Julius Hutchinson
Elizabeth Hutchinson (b. ca. 1668 – d. 10 March 1734) Married to 1st Lord Kennedy, 18 June 1697. Their son became John Kennedy, 8th Earl of Cassilis. Her 2nd marriage on 22 March 1701 was to John Douglas-Hamilton, 1st. Earl of Ruglen. 3rd Earl of Selkirk.

References
HUTCHINSON, Charles (1636-95), of Owthorpe, Notts., History of Parliament
Thorotons History of Nottinghamshire Volume 1 pages 157-160 by John Throsby 1790 British History On Line
A list of the second Parliament of King William (1690–1695) page 67-74
A list of the Third Parliament of King William (1695–1698) The History and Proceedings of the House of Commons Year pub. 1742 pp 75–81 Vol. 5 1713-1714
 A History of the County of Hereford, Volume 3 pp 91–111 By William Page yr pub. 1912 Subject (Woodhall Manor)

1636 births
1695 deaths
Politicians from Nottingham
English MPs 1690–1695
Place of birth missing